This is a list of Master of Laws programs by country.

Africa

Mauritius

International Business Law
 Panthéon-Assas University in Medine Education Village.

South Africa
 Nelson Mandela Metropolitan University
 Stellenbosch University
 University of Cape Town
 University of Fort Hare
 University of KwaZulu-Natal
 University of Pretoria
 University of South Africa
 University of the Free State
 University of Western Cape
 University of Witwatersrand

Asia

China
 China University of Political Science and Law (LL.M. program taught in English)
 China-EU School of Law (International Master of Chinese Law, Master of European and International Law, Master of Chinese Law, Double Masters)

Hong Kong

Human rights
 Faculty of Law, The University of Hong Kong

India
 Nalsar University of Law (Various specializations)

Japan
 Chuo University
 Doshisha University
 Kyushu University
 Keio University
 Nagoya University
 Niigata University
 University of Tokyo
 Waseda University

Singapore

International Business Law
 Panthéon-Assas University in Insead Campus.

Taiwan
 National Taiwan University
 National Chengchi University

Europe

Austria

Anglo-American Business Law
University for Continuing Education Krems

Business Law
Vienna University of Economics and Business

Contract Law & Management
University for Continuing Education Krems

Criminal Law, Business Law & Criminology
University for Continuing Education Krems

European Business Law
Vienna University of Economics and Business

European and International Business Law
University of Vienna School of Law

European Studies
University for Continuing Education Krems

Human Rights
University of Vienna School of Law
University for Continuing Education Krems

Insurance Law
University for Continuing Education Krems

International Dispute Resolution
University for Continuing Education Krems

International Legal Studies
University of Vienna School of Law

International Tax Law
Vienna University of Economics and Business

Legal Studies
Vienna University of Economics and Business
University for Continuing Education Krems

Belgium

Competition and Intellectual Property Law
Faculty of Law, Political Science and Criminology of the University of Liège

Netherlands

Air and Space Law
Leiden University

Commercial Law
Rotterdam University

Commercial legal practice
Amsterdam University

Constitutional and Public Administration Law
Amsterdam University

Criminal Law and Criminology
Groningen University
Amsterdam University
Free University Amsterdam
Tilburg University
Maastricht University

Dutch Law
Tilburg University - 6 specialisation programmes and 1 open programme
Leiden University - 7 specialisation programmes
Free University Amsterdam - 9 specialisation programmes
Maastricht University - 6 specialisation programmes
Nijmegen University - 5 specialisation programmes
Utrecht University - 4 specialisation programmes

Environmental Law
Tilburg University
Amsterdam University

European Law
Amsterdam University
Europa-Institut of Saarland University
Groningen University
Leiden University
Maastricht University
Nijmegen University
Utrecht University

European and International Business Law
Leiden University

Advanced Studies in European and International Human Rights Law
Leiden University

European and international taxation
Tilburg University
Amsterdam University

Advanced Studies in European Tax Law
Leiden University

European Union Business Law
Amsterdam University

European Private Law
Amsterdam University

Globalisation and Law
Maastricht University

Health Law
Amsterdam University

Information Law
Amsterdam University

International Law
Maastricht University

International Business Law
 Tilburg University
Free University Amsterdam

International Criminal Law
Amsterdam University

International and European Labour Law
 Tilburg University

International and European Public Law
 Rotterdam University
 Tilburg University
Amsterdam University
Free University Amsterdam
Nijmegen University
Utrecht University

International Economics and Business Law
Groningen University

International Law and the Law of International Organisations
Groningen University

International Law and Comparative Private Law
Groningen University

International Law of Human Rights and Criminal Justice
Utrecht University

International Trade and Investment Law
Amsterdam University

IT, Internet and Law
Free University Amsterdam
Groningen University

Justice and Safety & Security
Rotterdam University

Labour law
Amsterdam University
Maastricht University

Law and Management
Tilburg University

Law and Economics
Utrecht University

Law and Technology
 Tilburg University

Military Law
Amsterdam University

Notary Law
Leiden University
Amsterdam University
Free University Amsterdam
Nijmegen University
Utrecht University

Social law and social politics
 Tilburg University

(Dutch) Tax law
Tilburg University
Leiden University
Amsterdam University
Maastricht University - 2 specialisation programmes
Nijmegen University
Utrecht University

France

International Business Law
 Panthéon-Assas University

Germany

European and International Law
 University of Hamburg & China-EU School of Law

Global Licensing
 Darmstadt University of Applied Sciences

Health Law
 Düsseldorf Law School

Human Rights
Viadrina European University, Frankfurt (Oder)

Information and Technology
 Düsseldorf Law School

Intellectual Property
 Düsseldorf Law School

Law and Business
 Bucerius Law School

LLM Finance - course taught in English at the University of Frankfurt (i.e. Johann Wolfgang Goethe Universität) 
 Institute for Law and Finance

Italy

International Law
University of Turin, Faculty of Law
International University College of Turin

Sustainable Development
University of Milan, Faculty of Law

Portugal

International Business Law
Católica Global School of Law, Lisbon

Law in a European and Global Context
Católica Global School of Law, Lisbon

Spain

Intellectual Property Law
Universitat Pompeu Fabra
Universidad Autonoma de Madrid

Switzerland
University of Fribourg (Master of Laws in Cross-Cultural Business Practice - MLCBP)

International Law
Graduate Institute of International and Development Studies
 Geneva Academy of International Humanitarian Law and Human Rights

UK

England

Financial
London School of Economics and Political Science
King’s College London
University College London
Westminster University

Scotland

Financial
University of Glasgow

IT/Internet
University of Strathclyde

Wales

Various
Swansea University

North America

Canada

Air and Space Law
McGill University Faculty of Law

Bioethics
McGill University Faculty of Law

Common Law
University of British Columbia Faculty of Law

Comparative Law
McGill University Faculty of Law

Environmental Law
McGill University Faculty of Law

European Studies
McGill University Faculty of Law

United States

Admiralty Law
Tulane University Law School
University of Miami School of Law
The Charleston School of Law

Agriculture & Food Law
University of Arkansas School of Law

American Law
New England Law, Boston
Northeastern University School of Law
Saint Louis University School of Law
Syracuse University College of Law
Tulane University Law School
University of California, Hastings College of the Law
Washington University School of Law

American Business Law
Tulane University Law School
University of California, Berkeley School of Law
University of Tennessee College of Law

Banking
Boston University School of Law
Fordham University School of Law

Bankruptcy Law
UCLA School of Law
St. John's University School of Law

Child Law
Loyola University Chicago School of Law

Climate Change
Pace Law School

Commerce & Technology
University of New Hampshire School of Law (formerly Franklin Pierce Law Center)

Comparative Law
Louisiana State University Law Center
Notre Dame Law School
University of California, Hastings College of the Law
University of Miami School of Law
 ONU Democratic Governance/Rule of Law LL.M. Program
University of New Hampshire School of Law (formerly Franklin Pierce Law Center)

Constitutional Law
University of Pennsylvania Law School
Washington College of Law

Corporate Law and Governance
Cumberland School of Law (Samford University)
Harvard Law School
Loyola University Chicago School of Law
New York University Law School
Stanford University Law School
UCLA Law School
University of Pennsylvania Law School

Criminal Law
University of Buffalo Law School
University of New Hampshire School of Law (formerly Franklin Pierce Law Center)

Dispute Resolution
Benjamin N. Cardozo School of Law
George Washington University Law School
Pepperdine University School of Law
Thomas Goode Jones School of Law Joint J.D./LL.M.
University of California, Hastings College of the Law
University of Missouri, School of Law
Washington University Law School

Elder Law
Western New England College School of Law
Seattle University School of Law
Stetson University College of Law

Employee Benefits
The John Marshall Law School (Chicago)

Energy and Environmental Law
George Washington University Law School
Tulane University Law School
University of Houston Law Center
Vermont Law School

Entertainment and Media
UCLA Law School
Southwestern Law School

Entrepreneurial Law
University of Colorado Law School

Environmental Law
George Washington University Law School
Golden Gate University
Lewis & Clark Law School
Pace University School of Law
University of California, Berkeley School of Law
University of Denver, Sturm College of Law
University of Oregon
Vermont Law School
 University of Colorado Law School

Estate Planning
Western New England College School of Law
University of Miami School of Law

Family Law
Hofstra Law School
University of California, Hastings College of the Law

Federal Criminal Practice and Procedure
Mercer Law School

General Studies or U.S. Law (American Law for Foreign Attorneys)
American University Washington College of Law
Boston University School of Law
Cornell Law School
Columbia Law School
Duke Law School
George Washington University Law School
Georgetown University Law Center
Hofstra Law School
Indiana University Robert H. McKinney School of Law
New York University Law School
Northeastern University School of Law
Northwestern University Law School
Saint Louis University School of Law
Santa Clara University School of Law
St. John's University School of Law
Southwestern Law School
Stanford University Law School
Thomas Jefferson School of Law
Touro College Jacob D. Fuchsberg Law Center
Tulane University Law School
University of Arizona College of Law
University of California, Berkeley School of Law
University of California, Hastings College of the Law
University of Chicago Law School
University of Georgia School of Law
University of Michigan Law School
University of Minnesota Law School
University of Pennsylvania Law School
University of Southern California Law School
University of Virginia School of Law
Vermont Law School
Washington University School of Law
Yale Law School

Global Legal Studies
Northeastern University School of Law
The John Marshall Law School (Chicago)

Government Procurement Law
George Washington University Law School

Health Law and Global Health
Albany Law School
Georgetown University Law Center
Indiana University Robert H. McKinney School of Law
Loyola University Chicago School of Law
Northeastern University School of Law
Saint Louis University School of Law
Southern Illinois University Law School
University of Washington School of Law

Human Rights
Harvard Law School
Indiana University Robert H. McKinney School of Law
Northeastern University School of Law
Northwestern University Law School
University of California, Hastings College of the Law
University of Notre Dame Law School
St. Thomas University School of Law, Miami, Florida

Indigenous Peoples Law and Policy
University of Arizona College of Law

Information Technology and Privacy Law
The John Marshall Law School (Chicago)
University of Colorado Law School

Innovation and Technology Law
Seattle University School of Law

Insurance
University of Connecticut School of Law

Intellectual Property
Benjamin N. Cardozo School of Law
Boston University School of Law
Fordham University School of Law
Franklin Pierce Law Center (post-Affiliation: University of New Hampshire School of Law 'UNH Law')
George Mason University School of Law
George Washington University Law School
Indiana University Robert H. McKinney School of Law
The John Marshall Law School
Michigan State University College of Law
Santa Clara University School of Law
Seton Hall University School of Law
Thomas M. Cooley Law School
University of Akron School of Law
University of California, Hastings College of the Law
University of Colorado Law School
University of Pennsylvania Law School
University of Washington School of Law
Washington University School of Law
University of Houston Law Center

International Business Law
Northeastern University School of Law
University of California, Hastings College of the Law

International Business and Economics
Georgetown University Law Center

International Business and Trade Law
The John Marshall Law School (Chicago)
 Northeastern University School of Law

International Commercial Law
University of California, Davis School of Law (King Hall)

International and Comparative Law
Cornell Law School
Duke University School of Law
George Washington University Law School
Indiana University Robert H. McKinney School of Law
Tulane University Law School
Santa Clara University School of Law

International Criminal Law and Justice
University of New Hampshire School of Law (formerly Franklin Pierce Law Center)

International Development
 Northeastern University School of Law
ONU Law Rule of Law LL.M. Program
University of Washington School of Law

International Law
Albany Law School
American University Washington College of Law
Duke Law School
Fordham University School of Law
Fletcher School of Law and Diplomacy
University of New Hampshire School of Law (formerly Franklin Pierce Law Center)
George Washington University Law School
Georgetown University Law Center
Indiana University Robert H. McKinney School of Law
New York University Law School
 Northeastern University School of Law
Stetson University College of Law
Temple University Beasley School of Law
University of California, Berkeley School of Law
University of California, Hastings College of the Law
UCLA Law School
University of Georgia School of Law
University of Houston Law Center
University of Miami School of Law
University of Notre Dame Law School
University of Pennsylvania Law School
University of San Diego School of Law

International Tax & Finance Law
Harvard University Law School
New York University Law School
Thomas Jefferson School of Law
University of Florida Levin College of Law

International Trade & Business Law
University of Arizona College of Law

International Trade and Trade Regulation
Fordham University School of Law
New York University Law School
University of California, Hastings College of the Law
University of Pennsylvania Law School

Law & Economics
George Mason University School of Law

Military Law
The Judge Advocate General's Legal Center and School

Natural Resources Law
University of Colorado Law School
The University of Tulsa College of Law

Real Estate Law
New York Law School
The John Marshall Law School (Chicago)
Pace Law School
University of Miami School of Law (Real Property Development)

Rule of Law/Democratic Governance
 ONU Law Rule of Law LL.M. Program

Science and Technology
Stanford University Law School
University of California, Berkeley School of Law
University of California, Hastings College of the Law
Washington University Law School

Securities and Finance
Georgetown University Law Center
George Washington University Law School
University of Pennsylvania Law School
Chicago-Kent College of Law
Boston University Law School
New York Law School
New York University Law School
St. John's University Law School
Harvard University Law School

Tax Law
Boston University School of Law
Capital University Law School
Chapman University School of Law
Georgetown University Law Center
George Washington University Law School
Golden Gate University School of Law
Harvard Law School
The John Marshall Law School (Chicago)
Loyola Law School
Loyola University Chicago School of Law
New York Law School
New York University Law School
Northwestern University School of Law
University of Baltimore School of Law
University of Denver Graduate Tax
University of Alabama School of Law
University of California, Hastings College of the Law
University of Florida Levin College of Law
University of Miami School of Law
University of Missouri–Kansas City School of Law
University of San Diego School of Law
University of Washington School of Law
Temple University Beasley School of Law
Thomas M. Cooley Law School
Wayne State University Law School
Villanova University School of Law
Washington University School of Law

Trial Advocacy
American University Washington College of Law (degree in Advocacy)
California Western School of Law (with a Specialization in Federal Criminal Law)
Chapman University School of Law
Stetson University College of Law
Temple University Beasley School of Law

Tribal Law
Seattle University School of Law

U.S. Regulatory Trade Law

References

Master of Laws list